Bolton Lakes is a lake in the Ottawa River drainage basin in Central Frontenac, Frontenac County, Ontario, Canada. The primary outflow is Bolton Creek, which flows via the Fall River, and then the Mississippi River into the Ottawa River.

See also
List of lakes in Ontario

References

Lakes of Frontenac County